Charles or Charlie Smith may refer to:

Academics
C. Alphonso Smith (1864–1924), American professor, college dean, philologist, and folklorist
Charles Emrys Smith aka Dr.Charles Smith Brocca, British economist, educator, Swansea Metropolitan University / University of Wales
Charles Roach Smith (1806–1890), founding member of the British Archaeological Association
Charles Saumarez Smith (born 1954), British art historian
Charles Smith (topographer) (1715–1763), Irish topographer and writer
Charles Sprague Smith (1853–1910), founder and director of the People's Institute
Charles Piper Smith (1877–1955), American botanist
Charles Smith (mathematician) (1844–1916), British academic
Charles Forster Smith, American classical philologist

Arts and entertainment
Bubba Smith (Charles Aaron Smith, 1945–2011), American actor and football player
Charles A. Smith (architect) (1866–1948), American architect
Charles Alexander Smith (1864–1915), Canadian painter from Ontario
Charles Martin Smith (born 1953), American actor and director
Charles Patrick Smith (1877–1963), Australian journalist
Charles Smith (actor) (1920–1988), American actor
Charles Smith (artist) (1749–1824), Scottish artist
Charles Smith (singer) (1786–1856), English tenor and bass, organist and composer
Charles Smith (songwriter), American record producer and songwriter
Charlie Smith, character in Class
Charlie Smith (musician) (born 1979), American jazz musician
Charlie Smith (drummer) (1927–1966), American jazz drummer
Charlie Smith (footballer) (1915–1984), Welsh footballer
Charlie Smith (American poet) (born 1947), American poet and novelist
Charlie Smith (Romani poet) (1956–2005), British poet
Charles Smith (playwright), American playwright and educator
Charles Edward Smith (jazz) (1904–1970), American jazz author and critic
Charles Harriott Smith (1792-1864) English sculptor
Charles Raymond Smith (1798-1888) English sculptor
Dr. Charles Smith (born 1940), artist and activist

Military

 Charles Kingsford Smith (1897–1935), Australian aviator in WWI and afterwards

 Charles Aitchison Smith (1871–1940), Indian army officer and administrator

 Charles Douglass Smith (–1855), British army officer and colonial administrator
 Charles Hamilton Smith (1776–1859), British artist, soldier and spy
 Charles Felix Smith (1786–1858), British army officer

Charles Bean Smith, later Sir Charles Euan-Smith (1842–1910), British soldier and diplomat
Charles Bradford Smith (1916–2004), American army officer and Silver Star recipient
Charles Ferguson Smith (1807–1862), Union General of the American Civil War
Charles Henry Smith (Navy Medal of Honor) (1826–1898), American Civil War sailor and Medal of Honor recipient
Charles Henry Smith (Army Medal of Honor) (1827–1902), American Civil War officer and Medal of Honor recipient

Politics

Australia
Charles Smith (Victorian politician) (1833–1903), member of the Victorian Legislative Assembly 1883–1892
Charles Smith (Western Australian politician) (born 1970), member of the Western Australian Legislative Council from 2017

Canada
Charles A. Smith (Canadian politician) (1845–?), Canadian merchant and political figure in Nova Scotia
Charles L. Smith (Canadian politician) (1853–?), Canadian politician in New Brunswick
Charles Napier Smith (1866–1919), Canadian politician in Ontario
Charles Rhodes Smith (1896–1993), Canadian politician in Manitoba

United Kingdom
C. A. Smith (1895–?), British socialist and anti-communist activist
Charles Culling Smith (1775–1853), British politician and courtier
Charles Harding Smith (1931–1997), loyalist leader in Northern Ireland
Charles Smith (MP) (1756–1814), British politician, Member of Parliament

United States
Charles Aurelius Smith (1861–1916), governor of South Carolina
Charles Bennett Smith (1870–1939), U.S. Representative from New York
Charles Brooks Smith (1844–1899), U.S. Representative from West Virginia
Charles C. Smith (Virginia politician), mayor of Newport News, Virginia, 1924–1926
Charles C. Smith (Pennsylvania politician) (1908–1970), American representative from Pennsylvania
Charles Emory Smith (1842–1908), American journalist and politician
Charles F. Smith (politician) (1912–1962), member of the Arkansas House of Representatives
Charles F. Smith Jr. (1918–2001), American politician in Wisconsin senate
Charles Henry Smith (1826–1903), American politician in Georgia senate and writer under the nom de plume Bill Arp
Charles H. Smith (Wisconsin politician) (1863–1915), Wisconsin state legislator
Charles K. Smith (1799–1866), American politician, lawyer, and first secretary of Minnesota Territory
Charles L. Smith (Seattle politician) (1892–1982), mayor of Seattle, Washington
Charles Lynwood Smith Jr. (born 1943), U.S. federal judge
Charles Manley Smith (1868–1937), governor of Vermont, 1935–37
Charles P. Smith (1926–2014), Wisconsin State Treasurer
Charles P. Smith (judge), United States Tax Court judge
Charles Plympton Smith (born 1954), American banker and former member of the Vermont House of Representatives
Chuck Smith (Florida politician) (Charles R. Smith, born 1928), American politician
Charles Sydney Smith (mayor) (1828–1907), jeweler and mayor of Providence, Rhode Island
Charles Z. Smith (1927–2016), retired Washington State Supreme Court Justice
Charles Wallace Smith (1864–1939), former Speaker of the Michigan House of Representatives
Charlie Smith (Louisiana lobbyist) (1942–2012), American lobbyist

Other
Charles Abercrombie Smith (1834–1919), scientist, politician and civil servant of the Cape Colony
Robert Smith (colonial administrator) (Charles Robert Smith, 1887–1959), British colonial administrator and Governor of North Borneo

Science and technology
Charles H. Smith (historian) (born 1950), American historian of science
Charles Smith (pathologist), Canadian forensic pathologist reprimanded for his evidence in shaken baby cases since 1992
Charles Michie Smith (1854–1922), Scottish astronomer

Sports

American football
Charles H. Smith (American football) (active 1883–1894), American football center
Charles Smith (American football) (1924–2013), American football player
Charlie Smith (tackle) (1889–1961), American football tackle
Charlie Smith (running back) (born 1946), American football running back
Charlie Smith (wide receiver) (born 1950), American football wide receiver
Bubba Smith (Charles Aaron Smith, 1945–2011), American actor and football player

Baseball
Charles R. Smith (coach) (died 1969), American baseball and basketball coach
Charley Smith (1937–1994), American MLB third baseman
Charlie Smith (pitcher) (1880–1929), American MLB pitcher
Charlie Smith (infielder) (1840–1897), American MLB infielder
Chino Smith (Charles Smith, 1903–1932), Negro league baseball player
Pop Smith (Charles Marv Smith, 1856–1927), Canadian MLB infielder, 1880–1891
Red Smith (pitcher) (Charles Smith), American Negro league baseball player

Basketball
Charles Smith (basketball, born 1965), University of Pittsburgh and New York Knicks
Charles Smith (basketball, born 1967), Georgetown University and Boston Celtics
Charles Smith (basketball, born August 1975), University of New Mexico and Portland Trail Blazers
Charles Smith (basketball, born October 1975), American-English basketball player

Cricket
Sir C. Aubrey Smith (1863–1948), English actor and cricketer
Charles Smith (cricketer, born 1879) (1879–1949), English cricketer
Charlie Smith (South African cricketer) (1872–1947), South African cricketer
Charles Smith (cricketer, born 1861) (1861–1925), English cricketer
Charles Smith (cricketer, born 1864) (1864–1920), New Zealand cricketer and administrator
Charles Smith (cricketer, born 1849) (1849–1930), English cricketer
Charles Smith (South African cricketer) (1905–1967), South African cricketer
Charlie Smith (English cricketer) (1859–1942), English cricketer
Charles Smith (cricketer, born 1838) (1838–1909), English cricketer
Charles Smith (cricketer, born 1898) (1898–1955), English cricketer

Other sports
Charles Smith (sailor) (1889–1969), American sailor who competed in the 1932 Summer Olympics
Charles Sydney Smith (1876–1951), British three times Olympic water polo champion
Charles Eastlake Smith (1850–1917), British football player
Charles Smith (polo) (active 1972–1981), American polo player
Charles Smith (rugby) (1909–1976), New Zealand rugby football player
Charles C. Smith (boxer) (1860–1924), African American boxer
Charles Smith (Australian footballer) (1901–1968), Australian footballer
Charles Smith (English footballer), English footballer
Charlie Smith (golfer) (1931–2011), American golfer

Other people
Charles Smith (cowboy) ("Hairlip" Charlie Smith; 1844–1907), frontiersman and lawman in the Old West, member of Wyatt Earp's posse
Charles Lee Smith (1887–1964), American atheist activist
Charlie Smith (centenarian) (1874–1979), claimed to be the oldest person in the United States
Charles Pressley Smith (1862–1935), Anglican priest
Charles John Smith (1803–1838), English engraver
Charles Rattray Smith (1859–1941), schoolteacher in Britain and New South Wales, Australia
Charles Smith (developer) (1901–1995), American real estate developer and philanthropist in the Washington DC area
Charles Smith (priest), English Anglican priest 
Charles Spencer Smith (1852–1923), American bishop in the African Methodist Episcopal church
Charles Edward Smith (Baptist) (1835–1929), American author and Baptist ecclesiologist and apologist
Charles R. Smith, head of the Menasha Wooden Ware Co., who named Ladysmith, Wisconsin, after his wife
Charles "Chip" Smith, an alias of German murderer Christian Gerhartsreiter
Charles Howard Smith (1888–1942), British diplomat
Charles Howard Smith (trade unionist) (1875–1965), British trade union leader
Charles Loraine Smith (1751–1835), sportsman, artist and politician
J. Charles Smith III, American prosecutor in Frederick County, Maryland

Other uses
Charles E. Smith Co.
Chuck Smith (disambiguation)
Charles Smyth (disambiguation)